Alfredo Porzio (31 August 1900 – 14 September 1976) was an Argentine heavyweight professional boxer who competed in the 1920s. He was born in Buenos Aires.

Amateur career
As an amateur, Porzio won the South American Heavyweight Championship in Buenos Aires, CF, Argentina, in 1923. He won a bronze medal in boxing at the 1924 Summer Olympics in the heavyweight division, losing against Otto von Porat in the semi-final.

References

External links
 

1900 births
1976 deaths
Boxers from Buenos Aires
Heavyweight boxers
Olympic boxers of Argentina
Olympic bronze medalists for Argentina
Boxers at the 1924 Summer Olympics
Olympic medalists in boxing
Argentine male boxers
Medalists at the 1924 Summer Olympics